Antioch Township, Arkansas may refer to:

 Antioch Township, Hot Spring County, Arkansas
 Antioch Township, White County, Arkansas

See also 
 List of townships in Arkansas
 Antioch Township (disambiguation)

Arkansas township disambiguation pages